The 2003 Copa Nissan Sudamericana was the second edition of CONMEBOL's new international club tournament. It was won by Peruvian club Cienciano, who won the first international trophy for their club and the country. They also qualified to play in the 2004 Recopa Sudamericana.

First stage

Argentina Preliminary

|-
!colspan="5"|Argentina III Preliminary

|-
!colspan="5"|Argentina IV Preliminary

|}

Brazil Preliminary

Brazil 1 Preliminary

Brazil 2 Preliminary

Brazil 3 Preliminary

Brazil 4 Preliminary

Venezuela/Bolivia/2002 Champion Preliminary

First round

|-
!colspan="5"|Venezuela Preliminary

|}

Second round

|-
!colspan="5"|Venezuela/San Lorenzo Preliminary

|-
!colspan="5"|Bolivia Preliminary

|}

Peru/Chile Preliminary

|-
!colspan="5"|Chile Preliminary

|-
!colspan="5"|Peru Preliminary

|}

Colombia/Ecuador Preliminary

|-
!colspan="5"|Colombia Preliminary

|-
!colspan="5"|Ecuador Preliminary

|}

Paraguay/Uruguay Preliminary

|-
!colspan="5"|Paraguay Preliminary

|-
!colspan="5"|Uruguay Preliminary

|}

Second stage

Argentina Zone

|-
!colspan="5"|Quarterfinalist 4

|-
!colspan="5"|Quarterfinalist 8

|}

Brazil Zone

|-
!colspan="5"|Quarterfinalist 2

|-
!colspan="5"|Quarterfinalist 5

|-
|}

Venezuela/Bolivia/2002 Champion Zone

|-
!colspan="5"|Quarterfinalist 6

|}

Peru/Chile Zone

|-
!colspan="5"|Quarterfinalist 1

|}

Colombia/Ecuador Zone

|-
|-
!colspan="5"|Quarterfinalist 3

|}

Paraguay/Uruguay Zone

|-
!colspan="5"|Quarterfinalist 7

|}

Bracket

Quarterfinals

|}

Semifinals

|}

Finals

External links
CONMEBOL
Sudamericana 2003

2
Copa Sudamericana seasons